The Mini Stack is the freeway interchange among Interstate 10, State Route 51, and Loop 202 in Phoenix, Arizona, United States, located northeast of downtown. Reconstructed in 2004 to its current setup, the interchange, which is the busiest in the state of Arizona with over 300,000 vehicles per day, provides full directional access between the three freeways, as well as HOV lane connections for southbound SR 51 to eastbound I-10, westbound I-10 to northbound SR 51, westbound Loop 202 to westbound I-10, and eastbound I-10 to eastbound Loop 202.

Description 
The interchange constitutes exits 147A-B-C on Interstate 10; the final southbound exits on SR 51; and exit 1A on Loop 202. The Mini Stack serves as the western terminus of Loop 202's Red Mountain Freeway segment and the southern terminus of State Route 51. Interstate 10, the only through-route in this interchange, changes cardinal direction as it passes through the Mini Stack, heading from north to west for westbound travelers and east to south for eastbound travelers.

Delays
In a 2007 study performed by Forbes, the Mini Stack ranked number four in the United States in terms of delays with 22 million hours of delays each year. It was behind only Los Angeles' US 101 and I-405 interchange in California, Houston's I-610 and I-10 interchange in Texas, and Chicago's I-90/I-94 and I-290 interchange in Illinois.

Shooting incidents

From August to September 2015, the Mini Stack was the spot of a number of shootings, which were connected to a larger string of shootings and other incidents that injured a teenage girl and damaged several vehicles. The Mini Stack was the location of a majority of the shootings. A suspect was later said by Governor Doug Ducey to have been taken into custody.

See also
 SuperRedTan Interchange
 The Stack

References

External links
 Aerial view of Mini Stack

Buildings and structures in Phoenix, Arizona
Transportation in Phoenix, Arizona
Interstate 10
Road interchanges in the United States